Pascal Payet (born 7 July 1963) is a French criminal who has gained notoriety for his daring prison escapes using hijacked helicopters. He was initially sentenced to a 30-year jail term for a murder committed during the robbery of a security van in 1997.

Criminal career and escape attempts
Born in Montpellier, France, Payet spent his childhood in Lyon before settling in Marseille.  In 1988, he was convicted of aggravated assault and again in 1993 for conspiracy.  On November 20, 1997, he participated in an attack on a Banque de France armored car in Salon-de-Provence during which a guard was killed.  He was arrested along with Éric Alboreo in Paris in January 1999.

On October 12, 2001, he escaped from a prison in the village of Luynes in the French department of Bouches-du-Rhône on board a hijacked helicopter with Frédéric Impocco.  On October 18, Impocco was captured and brought in for questioning in Paris.  On April 14, 2003, Payet organized another helicopter escape from the Luynes prison, this time of Franck Perletto, Michel Valero, and Éric Alboreo, who had been arrested with him in 1999.  They were caught three weeks later.

In January 2005, Payet was sentenced to 30 years in prison for murder in connection with the 1997 armored car hijacking in Salon-de-Provence.  This sentence was upheld in May 2006 following an appeal by the cour d'assises of Var.  In December 2005, he published an open letter on his blog entitled "The Saga of My Transfers" (French: "L'épopée de mes transferts") in which he criticized the conditions of his imprisonment.  Before writing the letter he had gone on a hunger strike at a prison in Metz in protest against having been transferred nine times in 30 months.  In January 2007, he confessed to organizing the 2003 escape and was sentenced to an additional seven years in prison, while his co-conspirators were each sentenced to three.  He was also sentenced to another six years for his own escape in 2001.

By July 2007, Payet was one of the most closely surveilled prisoners in France and was never kept at the same prison for more than six months.  He had been officially classified as a "détenu particulièrement surveillé," or a prisoner under especially high surveillance, and placed in solitary confinement. Despite these measures, on July 14, 2007, taking advantage of Bastille Day celebrations, four masked men hijacked a helicopter from Cannes – Mandelieu Airport.  They used it to free Payet from his solitary confinement in a prison in Grasse.  The helicopter landed some time later at Brignoles, 38 kilometres north-east of Toulon, France, on the Mediterranean coast. Payet and his accomplices then fled the scene and the pilot was released unharmed.  Two days after his escape, a European arrest warrant was issued against him.

Payet was captured on September 21, 2007, in the town of Mataró, a suburb north of Barcelona in Spain.  He was transferred to French custody on October 4, 2007, along with two accomplices who had been captured with him, Alain Armato and Farid Ouassou.  He was then imprisoned in a location which has been kept secret for "security reasons."  On June 25, 2008, the cour d'assises of the Alpes-Maritimes department sentenced him to 15 years in prison with no chance of early release for a series of armed robberies and assaults against police officers while he evaded custody.

On April 8, 2011, the cour d'assises of Bouches-du-Rhône sentenced him to an additional five years of prison for his 2007 escape.  His three accomplices were sentenced to nine, seven and six years.  Some other prisoners judged complicit in the escape were given lesser sentences.

Payet is married and has two children.

In popular culture 
After making headlines around the world for his audacious Hollywood-style helicopter jailbreak, Pascal Payet has been the subject of a number of TV shows and articles. His latest feat was showcased on the Netflix original White Rabbit Project "Jailbreak" episode, where host Grant Imahara narrates the story in the middle of the reenactment, where Payet is portrayed by French actor Thierry Brouard.

World Record 

Pascal Payet holds the record for planning the most number of escapes by helicopter.

References

See also
List of helicopter prison escapes

Living people
1963 births
French escapees
Escapees from French detention
Criminals from Marseille
People convicted of murder by France
French people convicted of murder